Roccabernada is a town and comune of the province of Crotone in the Calabria region of southern Italy.

Notes and references

Cities and towns in Calabria